Radnor Township School District is a school district that serves Radnor Township, Pennsylvania and has 3 elementary schools, one middle school, and one high school.  Due to the mostly affluent demographic of the Main Line that the Radnor Township School District belong to, some locals place their children in local private schools. Those that do put their children in the Radnor Township School District generally do so for its reputation as an excellent school district, as it has several blue ribbon schools.

Schools 
 Ithan Elementary School
 Wayne Elementary School
 Radnor Elementary School
 Radnor Middle School
 Radnor High School

References

External links 
 

School District
School districts in Delaware County, Pennsylvania